In 2011, the  participated in the Currie Cup First Division and the Vodacom Cup. As part of the Southern Kings franchise, a number of players also participated in friendlies for this franchise, as well as the 2011 IRB Nations Cup.

Chronological list of events
12 January 2011: The EP Kings 2011 squad list is published on the official site and the fixture list for the season is revealed.
29 January 2011: A Southern Kings team consisting entirely of  players beat the Bulls Super Rugby team 23-7 in Port Elizabeth.
4 February 2011: The Southern Kings lose 45-17 to the Cheetahs Super Rugby team in Port Elizabeth.
11 February 2011: The Southern Kings lose 24-30 to the MTN Lions Super Rugby team in Port Elizabeth with a team containing only  players.
18 February 2011: The IRB announce details for the 2011 IRB Nations Cup, where several EP Kings players will represent the South African Kings team.  The other participants are Romania, Namibia, Georgia, Argentina Jaguars and Portugal.
Tries from Barend Pieterse, Darron Nell, Milo Nqoro (2), Monty Dumond, Morné Hanekom and Siyanda Grey helped them get off to a winning start in the competition and saw them in second place on the Southern Section log.
27 February 2011: The EP Kings sign the former  loose forward Jacques Engelbrecht.
They won 31-25, after the scores were level on 19-19 at half-time. The try scorers were Norman Nelson, Barend Pieterse and Mpho Mbiyozo. Two conversions and three penalties by Monty Dumond and a Jaco van Schalkwyk penalty rounded off the scoring.
A R15 000 fine was also imposed for fielding these players in two of the Southern Kings' games. The Kings have lodged an appeal against this decision, which ultimately proved unsuccessful.On the pitch, they beat the  23-8 with tries from Marcello Sampson and Matthew Tayler-Smith, with Jaco van Schalkwyk adding 13 points with the boot.
18 March 2011: The Kings announce the signing of former New Zealand Maori prop Clint Newland, who joins after a short stint playing for Irish team Leinster Rugby.
19 March 2011: The EP Kings beat the  51-0 in Vanderbijlpark to make it 4 wins in the row in the 2011 Vodacom Cup. They went top of the table, but with a points deduction still looming, this might be a false position. The try-scorers on the day were Norman Nelson and Devin Oosthuizen with a brace each, while Darron Nell, Marcello Sampson, Siyanda Grey and Morné Hanekom each also got a try. Jaco van Schalkwyk added 4 conversions and a penalty.
22 March 2011: After an injury to player Gurthrö Steenkamp, the Vodacom Bulls Super Rugby franchise requested Jaco Engels join their team as backup, but this approach was rejected by the Eastern Province Kings.
They went down to ten men after 33 minutes when full-back Mzwandile Stick was red-carded. Clint Newland scored the only try for the Kings, with Jaco van Schalkwyk adding 5 points with the boot.
30 March 2011: Eastern Province Kings are officially the 9 deducted points they gained in their first two Vodacom Cup games for fielding ineligible players, as well as fined R15 000 for fielding these players in two Southern Kings friendly games.  Their appeal against the original decision on 11 March was rejected.
Tries from Norman Nelson, SP Marais and Frank Herne and 13 points from the boot of Jaco van Schalkwyk weren't enough in this game. This result leaves the Kings in second last place on the log, with only an outside chance of making the quarter finals.
Two tries from Jacques Engelbrecht and one each from Wayne Stevens and Jaco Engels earned the Kings a bonus point, with conversions from SP Marais Jaco van Schalkwyk completing the scoring. Despite this result, the Kings missed out on a quarter final spot.
14 April 2011: EP Kings academy player Rynier Bernardo becomes the first ever player from this academy to be selected for an Under-20 Springboks training camp.
15 April 2011: The Kings beat the  45–43 in a 13-try thriller to finish the season in 5th place in the Vodacom Cup Southern Section, missing out on the Quarter Finals. Siyanda Grey, Barend Pieterse and Devin Oosthuizen all got two tries in this game and Jacques Potgieter added a further try. Jaco van Schalkwyk scored three conversions and Monty Dumond scored a further two.
25 May 2011: The South African Kings squad that will play in the 2011 IRB Nations Cup is announced. 26 of the 27 players in the squad are Eastern Province Kings players.
7 June 2011: The Kings announce the signing of fly-half Louis Strydom from the Free State Cheetahs.
9 June 2011: Monty Dumond leaves the Kings to join .
10 June 2011: A South African Kings team featuring 22 Eastern Province Kings players beat Georgia 31–17 in the 2011 IRB Nations Cup.
10 June 2011: A South African Kings team featuring 22 Eastern Province Kings players beat Georgia 31–17 in the 2011 IRB Nations Cup.
15 June 2011: 21 Eastern Province Kings players star in the South African Kings team that beat Romania 27–23 in the 2011 IRB Nations Cup.
19 June 2011: The South African Kings win the 2011 IRB Nations Cup after winning all three their games. In the third game, they beat Portugal 39–12, once again featuring 21 Eastern Province Kings players.
5 July 2011: Luke Watson is named the new Eastern Province Kings captain, with Mzwandile Stick becoming vice-captain. Both these players are included to the face  in a Currie Cup compulsory friendly.
8 July 2011: The Kings lost 26–20 to a young  team in their Currie Cup compulsory friendly. Mzwandile Stick scored a try and Louis Strydom scored five penalties in the defeat.
15 July 2011: Eastern Province Kings beat  28–20 in a repeat of last season's play-off final, with Norman Nelson scoring the only try for the home team. Louis Strydom scored the conversion and four penalties and George Whitehead added a further three penalties on his debut.
Marcello Sampson scored a hat-trick of tries and Jaco Bekker and George Whitehead each got two. Further tries were added by Barend Pieterse, Wayne van Heerden and Hannes Franklin, while George Whitehead also kicked six conversions.
29 July 2011: The Kings ran riot again, beating  67–26 in Port Elizabeth. Marcello Sampson scored a hat-trick of tries for the second game in a row. Jaco Bekker again got two tries, as did Norman Nelson. SP Marais, Siyanda Grey, Falie Oelschig and Luke Watson scored the other tries, with George Whitehead kicking six conversions.
3 August 2011: The  announce that they have signed Jacques Potgieter for 2012 on a two-year contract.
5 August 2011: The Eastern Province Kings beat the  36–20 and moved to the top of the table for the first time this season (with previous league leaders  having a bye this weekend). SP Marais scored three tries, Matthew Tayler-Smith scored two and Norman Nelson got one try for the Kings. George Whitehead converted two and Louis Strydom converted one of these tries to round off the scoring.
12 August 2011: The Kings moved seven points clear at the top of the log by beating nearest rivals  23–17 in a close-fought contest. Luke Watson and Clint Newland scored tries for the hosts, while fly-half Louis Strydom added two conversions, two penalties and a drop goal.
Norman Nelson scored two tries and further tries were scored by Matthew Tayler-Smith, Frank Herne and Luke Watson. Four conversions and a penalty from Louis Strydom, as well as two conversions from man of the match SP Marais completed the scoring.
30 August 2011: The  announce that they have secured the early release of Jacques Potgieter from his Kings contract and that he would join them effective 1 September.
2 September 2011: Yet another high-scoring game saw the Kings make it seven wins out of seven by beating local rivals  51–36 in Port Elizabeth. Captain Luke Watson scored two tries, while Marcello Sampson, Louis Strydom, Danie Faasen, Norman Nelson and Jaco Engels got one each. Three conversions from Louis Strydom and two penalties and two conversions from George Whitehead complete the scoring for the home side. The Under-21 team secured an even narrower victory, beating the Bulldogs 29–21, but the Under-19s lost 18–34.
10 September 2011: Eastern Province Kings stuttered to a narrow 21 – 19 victory over the  despite trailing 16 – 11 at half-time. The Kings' two tries were scored by Marcello Sampson and Joe Breytenbach, with Louis Strydom kicking 11 points. The result maintains their 100% record in this competition, but the  narrowed the gap at the top of the table to just one point by getting a bonus point in their fixture.
Marcello Sampson scored another two tries to take his tally for the season to ten. Further tries from Luke Watson, Ross Kennedy, Jacques Coetzee and Bobby Dyer ensured a bonus point was attained, while four conversions from Louis Strydom and one from George Whitehead rounding off the scoring. The Under-21 team won their fourth consecutive game, beating  39 – 20, but the Under-19 suffered their fourth consecutive defeat, losing 12 – 25 to the same opposition.
23 September 2011: A game which sees the top two teams in the division meet in Wellington sees the  run out comfortable 49 – 15 winners. Jaco Engels and Luke Watson scored the tries for the Kings, while SP Marais added five points with the boot. The Kings remain at the top of the table, one point clear of the Cavaliers, but have finished their regular season games, while the Cavaliers still have one game left to play against . The Under-21 team made it five in a row,  35 – 31 and qualifying for the title play-offs in the process. The Under-19s' woes continued, losing 27 – 50 to the Cavaliers, their fifth loss out of five.
30 September 2011: The Kings finish second on the log after the  beat . Despite not playing, the Under-21 team secured top spot in their pool.
7 October 2011: The Kings win their play-off semi-final game, beating the  48 – 17. Six tries were scored by Bobby Dyer, Jacques Engelbrecht, Norman Nelson, Devin Oosthuizen, SP Marais and Jaco Bekker, all six were converted - five by Louis Strydom and one by George Whitehead. Louis Strydom also added another two penalties to complete the scoreline.
Despite leading through an early try by Andile Witbooi – converted by Louis Strydom – the Cavaliers ran in six tries to easily win the game. A late try by Bobby Dyer was scant consolation on the day.
1 November 2011: Kings players Marlon Lewis and Milo Nqoro are named in an Emerging South Africa sevens team for the Safaricom Sevens tournament in Kenya.
2 November 2011: Lock Ross Kennedy leaves the Kings after being named in the ' 2011 Super Rugby squad. Also, prop Ronnie Uys is released from his contract.
3 November 2011: Yet another lock departs the Kings, with Rory Duncan announcing his retirement from rugby.
9 November 2011: Just days after lock Ross Kennedy left the Kings, it is announced that his father, Adrian Kennedy, also left the coaching staff of the Kings and returned to New Zealand.
12 November 2011: Former Springbok winger Jongi Nokwe joins the Kings on a one-year deal.

Players

Vodacom Cup squad
The following players appeared in at least one matchday squad during the 2011 Vodacom Cup competition:

Currie Cup squad
The following players appeared in at least one matchday squad during the 2011 Currie Cup First Division competition:

Under-21 Provincial Championship squad
The following players appeared in at least one matchday squad during the 2011 Under-21 Provincial Championship competition:

Under-19 Provincial Championship squad
The following players appeared in at least one matchday squad during the 2011 Under-19 Provincial Championship competition:

Player Movements

Tables

Vodacom Cup

Currie Cup

Matches

Vodacom Cup

Currie Cup

Player statistics

Vodacom Cup

Appearances
Vodacom Cup appearances, sorted by number of starts, then substitute appearances.

Cards
Vodacom Cup cards, sorted by red cards, then yellow cards.

Points scorers
Vodacom Cup points scorers, sorted by number of points.

Try scorers
Vodacom Cup try scorers, sorted by number of tries.

Currie Cup

Appearances
Currie Cup appearances, sorted by number of starts, then substitute appearances.

Cards
Currie Cup cards, sorted by red cards, then yellow cards.

Points scorers
Currie Cup points scorers, sorted by number of points.

Try scorers
Currie Cup try scorers, sorted by number of tries.

See also
Eastern Province Elephants
Southern Kings
2011 Vodacom Cup
2011 Currie Cup First Division
2011 Under-21 Provincial Championship
2011 Under-19 Provincial Championship

References

2011
2011 Currie Cup
2011 in South African rugby union